John David Tones (born 3 December 1950) is an English former professional footballer who played as a defender for Sunderland.

References

1950 births
Living people
People from the City of Sunderland
Footballers from Tyne and Wear
English footballers
Association football defenders
Sunderland A.F.C. players
Arsenal F.C. players
Swansea City A.F.C. players
Mansfield Town F.C. players
English Football League players